Chattanchal is a village in the Kasaragod district of Kerala, India. It is located near Thekkil, east of Kasaragod, along National Highway 66.

References 

Suburbs of Kasaragod